Austrian language may refer to:

 Austrian German, the variety of Standard German written and spoken in Austria
 One of the other Languages of Austria